Arabella is an opera in three acts by Richard Strauss.

Arabella may also refer to:

People
 Arabella (given name), a feminine given name - includes list of people and fictional characters named Arabella

Film, TV and books
 Arabella (1917), a 1917 drama Polish film directed by Aleksander Hertz and starring Pola Negri
 Arabella (1924 film), a 1924 German silent drama film
 Arabella (1967 film), a 1967 English-language Italian comedy film
 Arabella (novel), a historical romance novel by Georgette Heyer
 Arabella (TV series), a German talk show hosted by Arabella Kiesbauer
 AraBella (TV series),  an upcoming Philippine television drama series to be broadcast by GMA Network.

Music
 "Arabella" (song), a 2014 song by the Arctic Monkeys
 "Arabella", a song by Paice Ashton Lord from Malice in Wonderland

Places
 Irbid, Jordan, a city
 Arabella, Highland, Scotland, a village
 Arabella Station, in New Orleans, Louisiana
 841 Arabella, an asteroid
 Arabella Country Estate, a residential estate and golf course in South Africa
 Arabella Hochhaus, a high-rise hotel and office building in Munich

Other
 Arabella Advisors, a Washington, D.C.-based for-profit company that advises left-leaning donors and nonprofits about where to give money

See also
 Arabela (disambiguation)